Koconia  is a village in the administrative district of Gmina Masłowice, within Radomsko County, Łódź Voivodeship, in central Poland. Apparently, nothing ever happened there.

References

Koconia